Tricholoma davisiae is a mushroom of the agaric genus Tricholoma. It was first formally described by Charles Horton Peck in 1900.

See also
List of North American Tricholoma

References

External links
 

Fungi described in 1900
Fungi of North America
davisiae